HyperEdit is an application for Apple's Mac OS X developed by Jonathan Deutsch.

The software is primarily targeted at Web developers, combining a HTML (including CSS), PHP and JavaScript editor in one lightweight program. It offers customizable syntax highlighting for these weblanguages.

Some notable features include: W3C validation (underlines mistakes in red), JavaScript debugger, code snippets, color swatches palette, StartUp Items (to load specific documents on start-up) and live preview. The latter feature works for both HTML (with JavaScript, if enabled in Safari) and PHP sites on Mac OS X 10.3 and above.

To display webpages, Safari is used, which has a rendering engine named (WebKit).

HyperEdit is available as Shareware, and a free demo with some limitations is available at the developer's website.

PHP 5
It is possible to deploy the latest version of PHP, namely 5.x, on HyperEdit for Mac OS X v10.4 and above.

References
'Mini-review of HyperEdit 1.0', Macworld, October 15, 2004

MacOS text-related software